Kaidi Kivioja (born 23 February 1993) is an Estonian triathlete. She competed in the women's event at the 2016 Summer Olympics held in Rio de Janeiro, Brazil. She also competed in the women's event at the 2020 Summer Olympics held in Tokyo, Japan.

In 2015, she competed in the women's event at the 2015 European Games held in Baku, Azerbaijan.

References

External links

 

1993 births
Living people
Estonian female triathletes
Olympic triathletes of Estonia
Triathletes at the 2016 Summer Olympics
Triathletes at the 2020 Summer Olympics
Sportspeople from Rakvere
European Games competitors for Estonia
Triathletes at the 2015 European Games
21st-century Estonian women